Kaaraan  District is a district in the southeastern Banaadir region of Somalia. One of the oldest districts in Mogadishu, it is bordered by Shibis District, Yaqshid District, Abdiaziz District, Huriwa District and the indian ocean

Kaaraan is subdivided into six sub-districts: Jabuuti, Wajeer, Faanoole, Nageyle, Jamhuuriya and Arjantiin. 

The Karan District local authority offices were rehabilitated in 2013, after they had been destroyed in fighting between African Union (AMISOM) troops and Al-Shabaab, a designated jihadist terrorist group.

References

External links
Karan Facebook page
Districts of Somalia
Administrative map of Karan District

Districts of Somalia
Banaadir